Técnicas Reunidas, S.A. (meaning "Gathered Techniques"), or TRSA, is a Spanish-based general contractor which provides engineering, procurement and construction of industrial and power generation plants, particularly in the oil and gas sector.

TRSA is the primary holding company for a group of companies capable of providing several different integrated services for turnkey projects worldwide. Since 1959, the TRSA group of companies has designed and built over 1000 industrial plants worldwide. International projects account for 70% of the company's annual turnover, mainly in Latin America and China. The firm has also moved increasingly into the Middle East, and in January 2009 was awarded a $1.2 billion contract to develop two onshore fields in the UAE for a subsidiary of ADNOC.

Organization
The business divisions of TRSA are oil and gas, power generation and infrastructures.

The areas of activity covered by TRSA's companies are: the petrochemical industry, heat transfer, cogeneration and renewable energies, fertilisers and inorganic chemistry, environmental engineering, iron and steel plants, metallurgy, mining and hydrometallurgy.

Research and development

Since 1971, the company has its own research and development division. The company's R&D Centre, located in Madrid, Spain, is equipped with laboratory facilities and pilot and demonstration plants designed to be adapted to different process configurations. The R&D division develops new processes and the technological and economical improvement of existing ones, applying techniques and procedures of disciplines such as hydrometallurgy and electrochemistry. A fundamental objective is the upscaling from laboratory testing to industrial scale operations.

See also

List of oilfield service companies

References

External links
 

Engineering companies of Spain
Multinational companies headquartered in Spain
Non-renewable resource companies established in 1959
1959 establishments in Spain
Manufacturing companies based in Madrid
Companies listed on the Madrid Stock Exchange